The Philadelphia Force are a United Women's Lacrosse League (UWLX) professional women's field lacrosse team based in Philadelphia, Pennsylvania.  They have played in the UWLX since the 2016 season.  In the 2016 season, the four teams in the UWLX will play on a barnstorming format, with all four teams playing at a single venue.

Franchise history
The Philadelphia Force is one of the original four teams of the United Women's Lacrosse League (MLL). UWLX was founded by Digit Murphy and Aronda Kirby in a strategic partnership with STX. On February 23, 2016, Caitlin Jackson was announced as the first general manager in franchise history. On March 17, 2016, Missy Doherty was announced as the Force's first head coach.
 
The first game in franchise history took place on May 28, 2016 at Goodman Stadium at Lehigh University in Bethlehem, Pennsylvania. Opposing the Boston Storm, Philadelphia lost by a 16–8 mark. The team's first-ever goal was scored by Rebecca Lynch, with Hilary Bowen logging the assist. Bridget Bianco would register 11 saves in the loss.

Draft history
The following represented the Force's inaugural draft class. Michelle Tumolo would be the first player drafted in franchise history.

See also
Major League Lacrosse, the professional men's field lacrosse league in North America
National Lacrosse League, the professional men's box lacrosse league in North America
List of professional sports teams in the United States and Canada

References

United Women's Lacrosse League
Women's lacrosse teams in the United States
2015 establishments in Pennsylvania
Lacrosse clubs established in 2016
Sports teams in Philadelphia
Lacrosse teams in Pennsylvania
Women's sports in Pennsylvania